Isabelle Cyr is a Canadian actress and singer from Moncton, New Brunswick. She is most noted for her performance as the title character in the 1996 film Karmina, for which she received a Genie Award nomination for Best Actress at the 18th Genie Awards in 1997.

Cyr first became widely known for her ongoing role in the television drama series Chambres en ville. Her other credits have included roles in the films Malarek, Nelligan, Karmina 2, Savage Messiah (Moïse, l’affaire Roch Thériault), Love and Magnets (Les Aimants), 3 Needles, My Aunt Aline (Ma tante Aline) and Fear of Water (La peur de l'eau), and the television series Ramdam, Rumeurs, Nos étés, 30 vies and Conséquences.

As a singer, she released her self-titled debut album in 2008 on Les Disques Spectra. She followed up in 2011 with Pays d'abondance, an album recorded as a duo with her husband Yves Marchand, and in 2019 with Brûle sur mes lèvres.

She is the sister of actress Myriam Cyr.

References

External links

20th-century Canadian actresses
21st-century Canadian actresses
21st-century Canadian women singers
Canadian film actresses
Canadian television actresses
Canadian pop singers
Actresses from New Brunswick
Musicians from Moncton
Living people
Year of birth missing (living people)